Hanging Glacier may refer to:
 Hanging glacier, generic term for a type of glacier
 Hanging Glacier (Jefferson County, Washington)
 Hanging Glacier (Mount Shuksan)